Calvin Jay "CJ" Fodrey (born February 10, 2004) is an American soccer player who plays as a forward for Major League Soccer club Austin FC.

Career

Youth
Born in California, Fodrey began his career with local San Diego based clubs Albion Pros Club, San Diego Surf, and San Diego Nomads. He then joined the youth setup of Major League Soccer club LA Galaxy in 2019.

San Diego Loyal
Towards the end of 2020, Fodrey was invited to tryout with USL Championship club San Diego Loyal by the club assistant coach Nate Miller. He impressed during the trial and signed a USL academy contract with the club in December 2020. He scored his first goal for the club in their pre-season match against his former club LA Galaxy.

On May 22, 2021, Fodrey made his professional debut for San Diego Loyal against Louisville City, coming on as an 81st minute substitute in the 1–2 defeat.

San Diego State
In the fall of 2022, Fodrey joined San Diego State University to play college soccer. In his freshman season, Fodrey made 18 appearances, scoring seven goals and tallying four assists for the Aztecs. Fodrey was named All-Pac 12 First Team and Pac-12 Freshman of the Year in his debut college season.

On December 19, 2022, it was announced that Fodrey would leave college early, signing a Generation Adidas contract with Major League Soccer and entering the 2023 MLS SuperDraft.

Austin FC
On December 21, 2022, Fodrey was drafted 13th overall in the 2023 MLS SuperDraft by Austin FC.

Career statistics

References

External links
 Profile at San Diego Loyal

2004 births
Living people
American soccer players
Association football forwards
Austin FC draft picks
Austin FC players
San Diego Loyal SC players
San Diego State Aztecs men's soccer players
USL Championship players
Soccer players from San Diego